KORE (1050 AM) is a radio station in Eugene, Oregon, licensed to Springfield and Eugene.  The station is owned by KORE Broadcasting, LLC.

KORE is Eugene's oldest radio station.  It originally signed on from Portland in 1927 as KLIT but moved to Eugene and acquired the call letters KORE a few months later.  Originally a full-service radio station, it switched to country in 1970 and adopted a Christian format in 1973.

On June 15, 2016, KORE went silent.  On November 23, 2016, KORE resumed broadcasting as Sports-Talk with programming from Fox Sports Radio.

Programming

Weekdays
All Times are Pacific Time
The Dan Patrick Show with Dan Patrick – 6:00 a.m. - 9:00 a.m.
The Herd with Colin Cowherd – 9:00 a.m. - 12:00 p.m.
John Canzano Bald Faced Truth – 12:00 p.m. - 3:00 p.m.
Straight Outta Vegas w/ R.J. Bell (sports betting show; 3:00 p.m. – 4:00 p.m.)
The James Crepea Show – 4:00 p.m. - 6:00 p.m.
The Jason Smith Show w/ Mike Harmon -7:00 p.m. - 11:00 p.m.
The Ben Maller Show – 11:00 p.m. - 3:00 a.m.
Outkick The Coverage (3:00 a.m. – 6:00 a.m.)

Live Sports
Portland Trail Blazers Basketball
Los Angeles Chargers Football

Weekends

Saturdays
The Jonas Knox Show - 11:00 p.m. - 3:00 a.m.
Anthony Gargano & Lincoln Kennedy - 3:00 a.m. - 7:00 a.m.
The Big Lead with Jason McIntyre - 7:00 a.m. - 10:00 a.m.
Mark Willard & Joy Taylor - 10:00 a.m. - 1:00 p.m.
Steve Hartman & Brady Poppinga - 1:00 p.m. - 5:00 p.m.
Chris Broussard & Brian Noe - 5 p.m. - 8:00 p.m.
Arnie Spanier  - 8:00 p.m. - 11:00 p.m.

Sundays 
 The Jonas Knox Show  - 11:00 p.m. - 3:00 a.m.
 Fox Football Sunday with Andy Furman & Brian Noe - 3:00 a.m. - 6:00 a.m.
 Fox Football Fantasy with Michael Harmon & Dan Beyer  - 6:00 a.m. - 8:00 a.m.
 Fox NFL Kickoff Simulcast  - 8:00 a.m. - 9:00 a.m.
 Fox NFL Sunday Simulcast - 9:00 a.m. - 10:00 a.m.
 Ryan Field & Robert Smith - 10:00 a.m. - 2:00 p.m.
 Mike Hill & Ephraim Salaam - 2:00 p.m. - 5:00 p.m.
 Jonas Knox & Brady Quinn - 5:00 p.m. - 8:00 p.m.
 Arnie Spainer & Chris Plank - 8:00 p.m. - 11:00 p.m.

Translator
KORE also broadcasts on the following FM translator:

Simulcast
KORE is simulcast on KLSR-TV when KLSR is off the air.

Previous logo

References

External links
FCC History Cards for KORE

ORE
Springfield, Oregon
1927 establishments in Oregon